Mark Lawrence is a British actor from Swindon. He went to Dorcan School in Dorcan, studied in New York at the Lee Strasberg Institute, and started his career in London on shows such as CrimeWatch and Family Affairs. His most notable role was in the 2001 miniseries Band of Brothers.

References

External links

Year of birth missing (living people)
Place of birth missing (living people)
Living people
English male television actors
Actors from Swindon